Bhutan has only two universities that is RUB Bhutan and KGUMSB Bhutan.

This is a list of universities and colleges in Bhutan.
Royal University of Bhutan 
Royal Thimphu College
College of Science and Technology (Bhutan)
Royal Institution
College of Natural Resources (Bhutan)
Paro College of Education
Sherubtse College
Jigme Namgyel Engineering College
There are nine constituent colleges and two affiliated colleges under RUB
Khesar Gyalpo University of Medical Sciences of Bhutan (KGUMSB).
 Tango University of Buddhist Studies.
 Jigme Singye Wangchuck School of Law

References

External links 
 https://universityimages.com/list-of-universities-in-bhutan/

Universities
Bhutan
 List
Bhutan